The V Bomber Command is an inactive United States Army Air Forces unit. It was last assigned to Fifth Air Force, based at Irumagawa AB, Japan. It was inactivated on 31 May 1946.

During World War II the unit initially controlled Fifth Air Force bomber units in the Philippines. It was largely destroyed in the Battle of the Philippines, and withdrew to Australia at the end of December 1941, although elements of some units remained in the Philippines until April 1942. Re-equipped, the command provided command and control authority of Army Air Force bombardment organizations within the Fifth Air Force Area of Responsibility (AOR).

Afterward, served with the occupation force in Japan before being inactivated in 1946.

History
Participated in the defense of the Philippines in December 1941. Late in December the remaining bombers and some men were evacuated to Australia, and in January 1942 they were moved to Java to help delay the Japanese advance in the Netherlands Indies.

The command ceased to function in March 1942 (the AAF bombardment organizations in the Southwest Pacific being under the control of American-British-Dutch-Australian Command (ABDA) and later Allied Air Forces). Headquarters was remanned in September 1942 and shortly afterward it assumed control of AAF bombardment groups in Australia and New Guinea.

The command served in combat with Fifth Air Force until the end of the war. Brigadier General Kenneth N. Walker, who was killed during a mission over Rabaul on 5 January 1943, was awarded the Medal of Honor; he had repeatedly taken part in combat missions and had developed an effective technique for bombing when opposed by enemy interceptors and antiaircraft fire. After the war the command became part of the occupation force for Japan. Inactivated on 31 May 1946. Disbanded on 8 October 1948.

Lineage
 Constituted as the 5th Bomber Command on 28 October 1941
 Activated on 14 November 1941
 Redesignated V Bomber Command c. 18 September 1942
 Inactivated on 31 May 1946
 Disbanded on 8 October 1948

Assignments
 Fifth Air Force, 14 November 1941 – 31 May 1946

Stations

 Clark Field, Luzon, Philippines, 14 November 1941
 RAAF Base Darwin, Australia, December 1941
 Java, January–March 1942
 RAAF Base Townsville, Australia, 5 September 1942
 Jackson Airfield, Port Moresby, New Guinea, December 1942
 Nadzab Airfield, New Guinea, 21 February 1944
 Owi Airfield, Schouten Islands, Netherlands East Indies, c. 15 August 1944

 Bayug Airfield, Leyte, Philippines, November 1944
 McGuire Field, Mindoro, Philippines, January 1945
 Clark Field, Luzon, Philippines, March 1945
 Hamasaki (Motobu Airfield), Okinawa, August 1945
 Murayama, Japan, October 1945
 Irumagawa AB, Japan, c. 15 January – 31 May 1946

Units
 Wings
 314th Bombardment Wing: 30 May 1946 – 31 May 1946

 Groups
 3d Bombardment Group: 5 September 1942 – 31 May 1946
 6th Reconnaissance Group: 10 October 1943 – 1 March 1944
 19th Bombardment Group: 16 November 1941 – March 1942; September 1942 – 9 December 1942
 22d Bombardment Group: 5 September 1942 – November 1945 (attached to 309th Bombardment Wing, 1–16 February 1944)
 27th Bombardment Group: c. 20 November 1941 – 4 May 1942 (under operational control of American-British-Dutch-Australian Command after c. March 1942)
 35th Fighter Group: 10 November 1945 – 25 May 1946
 38th Bombardment Group*: 18 January – 1 August 1942

 43d Bombardment Group: 5 September 1942 – 3 December 1945
 49th Fighter Group: 10 November 1945 – 1 June 1946
 71st Reconnaissance Group*: November 1943-1 March 1944
 90th Bombardment Group: November 1942 – 23 November 1945
 312th Bombardment Group: 16 January 1944 – 18 October 1945
 345th Bombardment Group*: 5 June 1943 – 10 December 1945
 380th Bombardment Group*: May 1943-20 February 1946
 417th Bombardment Group*: 28 January 1944 – 1 November 1945
 494th Bombardment Group: operational control 15 December 1944 – 28 January 1945

*Note; Does not include periods detached to combat wings

 Squadrons
 2d Emergency Rescue Squadron, 5 September – 7 October 1944
 3d Emergency Rescue Squadron: operational control 26 August – 2 October 1944; assigned 21 November 1945 − 31 May 1946
 8th Photographic Squadron (later 8th Photographic Reconnaissance Squadron): assigned 5 September 1942 – 13 November 1943; attached c. 10 December 1945, assigned c 27 April 1946 – 31 May 1946
 20th Reconnaissance Squadron: 1 December 1945 – 31 May 1946
 25th Liaison Squadron: 24 November – 13 December 1943
 82d Tactical Reconnaissance Squadron: 1 February – 31 May 1946
 157th Liaison Squadron: attached 25 November 1945, assigned 25 March – 1 June 1946
 418th Night Fighter Squadron: attached 10 November 1945 – 20 March 1946
 547th Night Fighter Squadron: attached 10 November 1945 – 20 February 1946

See also
 United States Army Air Forces in Australia (World War II)

References

Notes
 Explanatory notes

 Citations

Bibliography

 
 
 

05 Command Bomb
Military units and formations disestablished in 1948